Frank Courtnay (6 June 1903 – 31 March 1980) was an Australian politician. Born in Melbourne, he was educated at state schools and then the Working Men's College before becoming a dairy farmer and later a plumber. He was Victorian and then national secretary of the Plumbers and Gasfitters Employees Union of Australia. In 1958, he was elected to the Australian House of Representatives as the Labor member for Darebin. He held Darebin until its abolition in 1969, at which point he retired. Courtnay died in 1980.

References

Australian Labor Party members of the Parliament of Australia
Members of the Australian House of Representatives for Darebin
Members of the Australian House of Representatives
1903 births
1980 deaths
20th-century Australian politicians
People from the City of Darebin
Politicians from Melbourne